Hammondsport Central School District is a school district in Hammondsport, New York, United States. The superintendent is Mr. Kyle Bower.

Administration 
The District offices are located 8272 Main Street. The current Superintendent is Kyle Bower.

Board of Education 
Jim Zimar–President
Dennis Carlson–Vice President
Lynda Lowin
Rick Drain
Kevin W. Bennett

Selected Former Superintendents 
Ms. Marilyn J. Dominick–?-2000
Dr. James J. Giordano–2000-2003
Dr. Christopher R. Brown–2003-2008

Secondary school 

Hammondsport Junior/Senior High School is located at 8272 Main Street and serves grades 7 through 12. The current principal is Mr. Tad Rounds. There is also a primary wing in the high school dedicated to k-3 and recently the curtiss school has been moved to the highschool. Now the highschool currently serves grades K-12 with Joe Koehler as elementary principal and Tad Rounds as Jr./Sr. High Principal.

History

Selected former principals 
Previous assignment and reason for departure denoted in parentheses
Mr. Daniel Perrine–?-2000
Mr. James J. Mitchell–2000-2002
Ms. Julie Sissell–2002-2005
Mr. Peter Robbins–2005-2006

Glenn Curtiss Elementary School 
Hammondsport Elementary School is located at 15 Bauder Street and is now being sold. Originally known as 'Hammondsport High School, Glenn H. Curtiss Memorial,' the school building most recently served grades 4-6. The students were moved to the main street school when the school was closed due to declining enrollment following the 2010 academic school year.  The school was designed in the Art Deco style by noted New York architect Graham O'Donnell and constructed in 1935.

History 
John Wright Jr. Founded the school in 1869

Selected former principals 
Ms. Patricia Kent–?-2002
Mr. Kyle Bower–2002-2008

See also 
Hammondsport Union Free School

References

External links
Official site

School districts in New York (state)
Education in Steuben County, New York